Andrew "Andy" Whyment (born 2 April 1981) is an English actor, known for portraying the role of Darren Sinclair-Jones in the BBC sitcom The Royle Family and Kirk Sutherland on Coronation Street.

Career
Whyment trained at the Laine Johnson Theatre School in Salford. His first credited part was in Cracker in 1993.  He also had minor roles in The Cops, Heartbeat and Where the Heart Is. From 1999 to 2000, Whyment appeared as Darren Sinclair-Jones in the BBC sitcom The Royle Family. Since 2000, he has played Kirk Sutherland in Coronation Street.

In 2006, Whyment appeared as a contestant in the ITV reality singing competition Soapstar Superstar. In July 2010, he was seen at an audition for The X Factor audition in Manchester; he was auditioning under his Coronation Street character and sang the Kings of Leon song "Sex on Fire". He also took part in the 2012 series of Dancing on Ice and was paired up with professional skater Vicky Ogden.

In 2019, He participated in the nineteenth series of I'm a Celebrity...Get Me Out of Here! and finished in second place.

Personal life
Whyment married his long-term girlfriend Nichola in 2007. They have two children, Thomas and Hollie.

Awards
 2003 – British Soap Award for Best Comedy Performance

See also
 List of Dancing on Ice contestants
 List of I'm a Celebrity...Get Me Out of Here! (British TV series) contestants

References

External links
 
 

1981 births
20th-century English male actors
21st-century English male actors
English male soap opera actors
I'm a Celebrity...Get Me Out of Here! (British TV series) participants
Living people
Male actors from Salford